John Clayton Allen (February 14, 1860 – January 12, 1939) was an American politician who represented Illinois in the United States House of Representatives from 1925-1933.

Allen was born in Hinesburg, Vermont in 1860. He attended the common schools and Beeman Academy, New Haven, Vermont before he moved to Lincoln, Nebraska in 1881, and to McCook, Nebraska in 1886. He engaged in mercantile pursuits at both places. He was a member of the McCook City Council 1887-1889; mayor of McCook, Nebraska in 1890; and Secretary of State of Nebraska 1891-1895.

Allen moved to Monmouth, Illinois in 1896 and became president of the John C. Allen Co. department store and of the People's National Bank of Monmouth. He served as member of the State normal school board 1917-1927 and was elected as a Republican to the Sixty-ninth and to the three succeeding Congresses (March 4, 1925 – March 3, 1933). He was an unsuccessful candidate for reelection in 1932 to the Seventy-third Congress and for election in 1934 to the Seventy-fourth Congress. After leaving Congress, he resumed his former business pursuits in Monmouth, Illinois until his death there in 1939. He was buried in Vermont Cemetery, Vermont, Illinois.

External links

1860 births
1939 deaths
Mayors of places in Nebraska
Nebraska city council members
People from Hinesburg, Vermont
People from McCook, Nebraska
People from Monmouth, Illinois
Businesspeople from Illinois
Secretaries of State of Nebraska
School board members in Nebraska
Burials in Illinois
Nebraska Republicans
Republican Party members of the United States House of Representatives from Illinois